Sally Thompson (born February 17, 1940) is an American politician who served as the Treasurer of Kansas from 1991 to 1998 and as the Chief financial officer of the United States Department of Agriculture from 1998 to 2001.

References

1940 births
21st-century American women
Kansas Democrats
Living people
State treasurers of Kansas
United States Department of Agriculture officials
Women state constitutional officers of Kansas